Phagres was a Greek city located in ancient Thrace and later in Macedon, in the region between the river Strymon and the river Nestos called Edonis or Pieris. It was founded by colonists from Thasos. It was perhaps together with Galepsus and Apollonia occupied and destroyed by Philip II of Macedon after the capture of Amphipolis. Despite this, archeological remains include Hellenistic finds and indications that Phagres survived into the Roman period.

Its site is located near modern Orfani (Orphanion).

See also
Greek colonies in Thrace

References

Populated places in ancient Thrace
Populated places in ancient Macedonia
Former populated places in Greece
Greek colonies in Thrace
Eastern Macedonia and Thrace
Thasian colonies